Solanum atropurpureum, commonly known as malevolence, purple devil and the five-minute plant, is a perennial herbaceous plant native to Brazil. S. atropurpureum contains various toxic tropane alkaloids in its fruit, stems, and leaves, and should not be ingested.

The plant is a small shrub growing 1.2 to 1.8 meters in height and 90 to 120 cm in width with ovate, spade shaped leaves 5 to 10 cm long when fully grown.  It blooms yellow to white flowers in the late spring to mid summer, and produces small (1–2 cm wide) orange fruit. The fruit's juices can be irritating to the touch, so it is recommended that gloves be used when removing or handling. The plant is characterized by its purple stems, which are completely covered by striking purple and green thorns about 2 cm long, from which its common names are ostensibly derived. The plant is short lived with a 3 to 5-year lifespan.

The plant can be grown ornamentally, requiring full sun and modest water. Seeds can be harvested from the fruits, and stem cuttings can be used to grow the plant in about 10 to 20 days.

It is also known as a natural reservoir of the potato virus X.

Gallery

References

External links
 Kew Plant List
 IPNI Listing
 Plant Lust

atropurpureum
Flora of Brazil